The Civil Aviation Authority of Zimbabwe (CAAZ) is the civil aviation agency of Zimbabwe, established on 1 January 1999 to replace the Department of Civil Aviation. Its head office is located on the level 3 of Harare International Airport, Harare, Zimbabwe.

See also

List of airports in Zimbabwe
List of civil aviation authorities

References

External links
 Civil Aviation Authority of Zimbabwe

Government of Zimbabwe
Zimbabwe
Civil aviation in Zimbabwe
Government agencies established in 1999
1999 establishments in Zimbabwe
Transport organisations based in Zimbabwe